A leadership election in the Australian Labor Party, then the opposition party in the Parliament of Australia, was held on 9 February 1967. It followed the resignation of previous leader Arthur Calwell. The contest was won by Calwell's deputy Gough Whitlam in a caucus ballot.

Results

Leader
The following table gives the ballot results:

Deputy leader
The following table gives the ballot results:

References

Australian Labor Party leadership spills
Australian Labor Party leadership election